The Pequannock Township School District is a comprehensive community public school district that serves students in pre-kindergarten through twelfth grade from Pequannock Township, in Morris County, New Jersey, United States.

As of the 2018–19 school year, the district, comprising five schools, had an enrollment of 2,123 students and 167.5 classroom teachers (on an FTE basis), for a student–teacher ratio of 12.7:1.

The district is classified by the New Jersey Department of Education as being in District Factor Group "GH", the third-highest of eight groupings. District Factor Groups organize districts statewide to allow comparison by common socioeconomic characteristics of the local districts. From lowest socioeconomic status to highest, the categories are A, B, CD, DE, FG, GH, I and J.

Awards and recognition
During the 2009–10 school year, Hillview School was awarded the Blue Ribbon School Award of Excellence by the United States Department of Education, the highest award an American school can receive.

NAMM named the district in its 2008 survey of the "Best Communities for Music Education", which included 110 school districts nationwide.

Schools
 
Schools in the district (with 2018–19 enrollment data from the National Center for Education Statistics) are:
Elementary schools
Stephen J. Gerace Elementary School 290 with students in grades K-5
Matthew Reiner, Principal
Hillview Elementary School 313 with students in grades K-5
Allison Stager, Principal 
North Boulevard Elementary School 340 with students in grades K-5
Theodore Loeffler, Principal
Middle school
Pequannock Valley School with 459 students in grades 6-8
John Seborowski, Principal

High school (9-12)
Pequannock Township High School with 701 students in grades 9-12
Richard M. Hayzler, Principal

Administration
Core members of the district's administration are:
Michael Portas, Superintendent
Sallyann McCarty, Business Administrator / Board Secretary

Board of education
The district's board of education, with nine members, sets policy and oversees the fiscal and educational operation of the district through its administration. As a Type II school district, the board's trustees are elected directly by voters to serve three-year terms of office on a staggered basis, with three seats up for election each year held (since 2015) as part of the November general election.

References

External links
Pequannock Township School District

Pequannock Township School District, National Center for Education Statistics

Pequannock Township, New Jersey
New Jersey District Factor Group GH
School districts in Morris County, New Jersey